Horse coins (Traditional Chinese: 馬錢; Simplified Chinese: 马钱; Pinyin: mǎ qián), alternatively dama qian (打馬錢), are a type of Chinese numismatic charm that originated in the Song dynasty (or as early as the Tang dynasty) and presumed to have been used as gambling tokens. Although many literary figures wrote about these coins their usage has always been failed to be mentioned by them. Most horse coins tend to be round coins, 3 centimeters in diameter with a circular or square hole in the middle of the coin. The horses featured on horse coins are depicted in various positions such as lying asleep on the ground, turning their head while neighing, or galloping forward with their tails rising high. it is currently unknown how horse coins were actually used though it is speculated that Chinese horse coins were actually used as game board pieces or gambling counters. Horse coins are most often manufactured from copper or bronze, but in a few documented cases they may also be made from animal horns or ivory. The horse coins produced during the Song dynasty are considered to be those of the best quality and craftsmanship and tend be made from better metal than the horse coins produced after. Some horse coins would feature the name of the famous horses they depicted. It is estimated that there are over three hundred variants of the horse coin. Some horse coins contained only an image of a horse while others also included an image of the rider and others had inscriptions which identify the horse or rider. During the beginning of the year of the horse in 2002 Chinese researchers Jian Ning and Wang Liyan of the National Museum of Chinese History wrote articles on horse coins in the China Cultural Relics Newspaper, noting that they found it a pity that the holes in the coins covered the saddles of the horses as this could have revealed more about ancient horse culture. Horse coins from the Song dynasty are the horse coins that are produced at the highest quality while horse coins from subsequent dynasties tend to be inferior compared to them.

Horse coins often depicted famous horses from Chinese history or famous horses from Chinese mythology, while commemorative horse coins would also feature riders, such as the horse coin that features “General Yue Yi of the State of Yan” commemorating the event that a Yan general attempted to conquer the city of Jimo. Another horse coin depicts the Chinese mythological horse long ju (龍駒), this horse was first mentioned in the "Rites of Zhou". The Rites of Zhou describes a "dragon colt" as a horse which is "more than 8 chi (尺) tall" when its measured from its front hoof to the shoulder. One chi, during the Zhou dynasty period, was about 16.5 centimeters in the metric system. 

It is rare for horse coins to also feature images of horses in armour but a few rare examples from the Song dynasty exist (and it is even rarer for these coins to also feature a saddle) as well as some from the Mongol Yuan dynasty that feature horses wearing typical Mongolian horse armour. As horse coins from the Yuan dynasty are extremely rare there has not been much research undertaken in determining their usage and origins.

Names  

Horse coins are referred to in Mandarin Chinese as either maqian (馬錢) or dama qian (打馬錢).

When horse coins are used as game pieces they are referred to as dama geqian and when they are used as gambling pieces they are referred to as dama boxi.

Categorisation  

While there are many known varieties of horse coins, they can generally be categorised into three basic types based on their design. 

 The first type depicts a picture of the horse on one side of the horse coin and the inscription identifying the horse written down on the other side of the coin. 

 The second type has both the image of the horse as well as the inscription depicted on the same side of the coin with the reverse side being left blank. 

 The third type, which is the most rarest of types, has the identical picture of the horse as well as the inscription on both sides of the coin.

Horse coins carved into cash coins  

On the island of Java it was sometimes done to take an existing circulating cash coin, for example a Kan'ei Tsūhō (寛永通寳) cash coin, and engrave the design of a horse coin into it. The Javanese also did this with other designs.

Ferghana horse coins  

Ferghana horse coins, also known as Sweating blood horse coins or Akhal-Teke horse coins, are a type of horse coin that feature Ferghana horses. References to Ferghana horses have been traced back as far as the reign of Emperor Wu of the Han dynasty. Ferghana horse coins don't include references to specific Ferghana horse, rather they display imagery and inscriptions used to represent the entire breed. Ferghana horse coins date back to the Song dynasty. 

These horse coins display the image of a Ferghana horse with two Traditional Chinese characters hàn xiě (汗血) which translates into English as "sweats blood".

Rare specimens of Ferghana horse coins  

Only a single specimen of a Ferghana horse coin with an identical obverse and reverse design (合背錢) dating to the Song dynasty is known to exist, it is 31mm (1.2 inches) in diameter. This coin was previously known to be in the collection of Mr. Wei Yutian (1854–1937) and was sold at the Xiling Yinshe Auction Co., Ltd. (西泠印社拍卖有限公司) 2017 Spring Auction for US$1,580 (or about 10,350 RMB).

List of horse coins 

List of types of horse coins depicting famous horses:

Notes

References

Sources  

 THIERRY, François, "Les monnaies au cheval, maqian ou damaqian", Bulletin de la Société Française de Numismatique, juin 1991, n°6, pp. 122-126. (in French).

Further reading 
 Joe Cribb, "Horse Coins: Pieces for Da Ma, the Chinese Board-Game 'Driving the Horses'", in Irving Finkel (ed.) Ancient Board Games in Perspective: papers from the 1990 British Museum colloquium, with additional contributions, (London: British Museum Press, 2007), pp. 116–124. .
 Andrew Lo, "An Introduction to Board Games in Late Imperial China", in Irving Finkel (ed.) Ancient Board Games in Perspective: papers from the 1990 British Museum colloquium, with additional contributions, (London: British Museum Press, 2007), pp. 125–132. .

External links 

 Public domain books about horse coins. (Wikimedia Commons)

Amulets
Chinese numismatic charms
Chinese numismatics
Horses in China